Monthault (Gallo: Montaut) is a commune in the Ille-et-Vilaine department in Brittany in northwestern France.

Population
Inhabitants of Monthault are called Monthaltais in French.

Notable people
Eustace de Montaut, Anglo-Norman baron in England

See also
Communes of the Ille-et-Vilaine department

References

External links

Mayors of Ille-et-Vilaine Association 

Communes of Ille-et-Vilaine